Ewald Kooiman (June 14, 1938 in Wormer, North Holland – January 25, 2009 in Hurghada), was a Dutch organist. He studied organ in Amsterdam with Piet Kee and with Jean Langlais in Paris. In addition, he was professor of Romance languages.

Recordings
He recorded the complete organ works of Johann Sebastian Bach twice on contemporary organs on LP and CD. A third recording cycle on Silbermann organs in Alsace, which Kooiman had started in April 2008 for the German label Aeolus was only partly completed at the time of his unexpected death.

Teaching
Kooiman taught organ at the Vrije Universiteit in Amsterdam, as well as at the International Summer Academy for Organists in Haarlem, with a particular emphasis on the performance of J.S. Bach's organ music. Jos van der Kooy and Christine Kamp are among his students.

As a visiting professor, he taught at various universities in Europe, South Africa and Korea. He also edited more than 50 editions of organ music, mainly covering the 17th to the 19th century. Kooiman was internationally recognized as a specialist in historically informed performance, particularly with regard to the organ works of Johann Sebastian Bach. He published numerous books and articles on Bach performance practice and other organ-related research topics.

Kooiman died of a cardiac arrest during a holiday trip to Egypt on January 25, 2009.

External links 
 Homepage

1938 births
2009 deaths
People from Wormerland
Dutch classical organists
Male classical organists
Dutch performers of early music
20th-century classical musicians
20th-century organists
20th-century Dutch male musicians